Jackson, also known as Jackson Station, is an unincorporated community in Cicero Township, Tipton County, in the U.S. state of Indiana.

History

Jackson was located  miles north of Tipton, Indiana. The village was founded around the building of a saw mill, which operated on steam, by Newton J. Jackson and George Kane in 1851. In 1854, the Peru and Indianapolis Railroad was completed and a train station was built in Jackson. The village grew around the increased number of shipments that were processed at the station. Elijah C. Elliott opened a general store in the village after 1865. Elliott also had a factory that made "staves and heading". By 1914, the railroad station was closed. At that time, a school and church still existed in the village.

A post office was established under the name Jackson Station in 1863, was renamed Jackson in 1882, and operated until it was discontinued in 1905.

Geography

References

Kokomo, Indiana metropolitan area
Unincorporated communities in Tipton County, Indiana
Unincorporated communities in Indiana